Akash Dasnayak (born 17 September 1981), popularly known by the film industry name Akash, is an Odia film actor and politician known for doing action-oriented movies. He was also the MLA of Korei Constituency.

Personal life
He was born at Jajpur Road on 17 September 1981 in Odisha, India to Mayadhar Nayak and Indira Das. He graduated from Vyasanagar College, Jajpur Road (LLB) from Utkal University.  His aunt Anita Das was a veteran film actress. He debuted in the Oriya film industry in 2008 with film Kalinga Putra, receiving a Best Actor award. Since then, he has acted in several movies like Mita Basichi Bhoota Saathire and Just Mohabatt.

Filmography
 Kalinga Putra (2008)
 Satya Meba Jayate (2008)
 Shatru Sanghar (2009)
 Subha Vivaha (2010)
 Asibu Kebe Saji Mo Rani (2010)
 Aalo Mora Kandhei (2010)
 Sangam (2012)
 Raju Awara (2012)
 Shapath (2012)
 Guru (2012)
 Khiladi (2013)
 Dharma (2013)
 Hari on Hari (2013)
 Mita Basichi Bhoota Saathire (3D) (2013).
 Sangram (2015)
 Tu Kahibu Na Mu (2016)
 Agastya (2016)
 Just Mohabatt (2017)
 Herogiri (2019)
 Mahabahu (2022)

Awards
 Best Actor award from Government of Odisha.

References

External links
 Akash Das Nayak Profile Biography and Wallpapers from New Odisha
 Biography of Akash Das Nayak and Watch Online Odia Movies
 Ollywood gaga over Akash Das Nayak's new release 'Raju Awara'
 Orissa: An interview with Odia Film sensation actor Akash Dasnayak
 Imdb: Akash Das Nayak is an actor, known for Subha Vivaha (2010), Shapath (2012) and Satya Meba Jayate (2008). See full bio

1981 births
Living people
Male actors in Odia cinema
Members of the Odisha Legislative Assembly
Male actors from Odisha
Indian male film actors
21st-century Indian male actors
Indian actor-politicians
Biju Janata Dal politicians